Paul McGillion is a Scottish actor, who has worked in television, film and theatre. He is best known for his role on the television series Stargate Atlantis as Dr. Carson Beckett.

Early life
McGillion was born in Paisley, Renfrewshire, Scotland. His family moved to Canada when he was two years old. McGillion returned to Scotland with his family during his early teens, for a few years, while his father worked on the Shetland oil rigs. He is the sixth of seven children. He has a degree in teaching and while studying at Brock University, was part of their national championship-winning wrestling team. After graduating, McGillion began his career teaching theatre in Toronto, squeezing in time to attend auditions. He finally made the move to Vancouver, where he has worked extensively in film, TV and theatre.

Career
McGillion taught scene study at the Vancouver Film School in 1998 and 1999. McGillion played young Ernest Littlefield in Stargate SG-1'''s first season, in the episode "The Torment of Tantalus", the first Tau'ri to have passed through the Stargate after its burial.  In 2004, McGillion was cast in the science fiction series Stargate Atlantis as the Scottish medical doctor, Carson Beckett. He was initially cast as a recurring guest, but his character appeared so frequently in the show's first season, he was promoted to main character for seasons two and three. Dr. Beckett went back to a recurring character for seasons four and five, where he appears as the clone of the now-deceased Beckett.

McGillion has appeared in films, The Traveler with Val Kilmer, Confined with Emma Caulfield,  and The Deal with Christian Slater. And has starred in the 2003 multi-award-winning film See Grace Fly. He stars in the short film A Fine Young Man, which premiered at the Toronto International Film Festival to rave reviews and won the Leo Awards for Best Short Film and Lead Actor for McGillion.

McGillion expressed great interest in auditioning for the role of Montgomery Scott in the 2009 eleventh Star Trek film. “I grew up watching Star Trek and Scotty was my favourite character. It would be a great honour to follow in James Doohan’s footsteps," McGillion said. He had the endorsement of Chris Doohan, the son of original Scotty actor James Doohan, to play the role of Scotty in the film. Though the part ultimately went to Simon Pegg, McGillion still appeared in the film in a different role.

McGillion appeared in Season 7 on the TV series 24'' as Dr. Levinson, a doctor who tried to extract a dangerous pathogen from Jack Bauer's bloodstream.

McGillion appeared as the husband of a dying patient, in a season 3 episode of The Good Doctor.

Filmography

Film

Television

References

External links 

 

1969 births
Living people
Male actors from Paisley, Renfrewshire
Male actors from Vancouver
Scottish emigrants to Canada
Scottish male film actors
Scottish male stage actors
Scottish male television actors